The 1964–65 season was the 41st season in the existence of AEK Athens F.C. and the sixth consecutive season in the top flight of Greek football. They competed in the Alpha Ethniki, the Greek Cup and the European Cup Winners' Cup. The season began on 9 September 1964 and finished on 2 July 1965.

Overview

In the summer of 1964, the management of AEK Athens, having the goal of winning the league, hired Mirko Kokotović, a successful coach at the time, who had won the Turkish championship with Fenerbahçe and participated in the quarter-finals of the European Cup Winners' Cup. Furthermore, with the great Kleanthis Maropoulos acting as the technical director, AEK proceeded in great transfer moves, as Fotis Balopoulos was acquired from Proodeftiki, Giorgos Kefalidis was also acquired from Pierikos, as well as the legendary Lefter Küçükandonyadis from Fenerbahce, even though he was at an advanced age. At the first training and the consecration of AEK, 4,000-5,000 fans were gathered and showed great enthusiasm, while the management of the team expressed faith and optimism for winning the championship.

AEK played for the first time in their history in the final stage of UEFA competitions and specifically of the Cup Winners' Cup, which were drawn for its first round against Dinamo Zagreb. Over 30,000 fans rushed to AEK Stadium on 9 September, to see the top scorer of the World Cup of Chile, Dražan Jerković, and the rest of the famous Yugoslavs play. However, the spectacle was not what was expected, since both clubs started scared and harsh. The Yugoslavs were extremely unsportsmanlike in their game, as they wanted a draw and to kill the time, while AEK pressed unorthodoxly, but were unable to create many dangerous chances. The referee refused the penalty and the players of the Union were overcome by intense irritation and the bad match continued in the second half, but in the hourmark, the Yugoslavs had gone too far with unsportsmanlike tackling which resulted in Zdenko Kobeščak dismissal with a straight red after a harsh tackle that lifted Mimis Papaioannou in the air. A fight between the players ensued, the enraged fans threw oranges and objects on the pitch and the game was almost stopped at the expense of AEK. That inrerruption favored AEK who scored twice within 5 minutes with Papaioannou and Nestoridis and the game ended with AEK gaining an important advantage, while also achieving a historic victory, the first in their history in the UEFA competitions. The rematch at Stadion Maksimir turned into a battle after the Yugoslavs showed unprecedented fanaticism and played even tougher than the first leg. The referee decided to take cards out of his pocket only when things got dangerously out of hand in the second half. Dynamo played much more aggressively, but the very good performance of Stelios Serafidis and Aleko Yordan limited the Yugoslavs' striker, Dražan Jerković, however the half ended in the worst possible way for AEK, as they found themselves losing by 1–0 at the stoppage time. With the game bordering on unsportsmanlike, Dynamo quickly equalized the score of the first match and 7 minutes later they made it 3-0. From that point on, no football was played as the players of AEK, clearly irritated and overwhelmed by the hard play of their opponents, started to play unsportsmanlike, while the atmosphere was particularly tense and Spyros Pomonis was sent off in the 76th minute, as well as Slaven Zambata at the 85th minte. A new series of incidents followed, which culminated in the end, when some of the fans of Dynamo entered the playing field and moved against the Greek team. The worst were avoided, but the final result remained, which left AEK out of the tournament.

Their beginning in the championship was not the best. In the first three matches AEK had two draws and a victory away from home by the emphatic 1–7 against Apollon Athens, but since then, their performance was stabilized at a satisfactory level for the first round of the championship. On the 12th matchday, they faced Panathinaikos at home and after their 2-2 draw in a match that, due to the large crowd at the stadium and its pressure, the billboards caved in resulting in 27 injuries, they improved their performance. In the crucial postponed match at Karaiskakis Stadium against Olympiacos, who was the other contender for the championship before 45,000 spectators, AEK found themselves losing 1–0 but with a sustained counter-attack in the second half they won 1–2, taking the second place, leaving the red and whites one point behind. The crucial match that largely decided the champion took place on the 26th matchday with AEK facing Panathinaikos away from home. AEK started the match decisively losing several chances, however Panathinaikos took a 1–0 lead immediately after the first half hour, while in the second half, Panathinaikos were better and the footballers of AEK were fruistated by not being able to turn the situation around. Thus, AEK was left behind in claiming the championship and in the last matchday, they faced Olympiakos and in front of 25,000 spectators even though they were ahead by 3–1, they eventually were equalized in the 90th minute, resulting in the match ending 3–3 with AEK finishing second in the league.

In the Greek Cup, AEK were eliminated at the quarter-finals, losing by 3–1 from Olympiacos away from home, after they had eliminated Athinaikos and PAOK winning both by 4–0 at home.

Players

Squad information

NOTE: The players are the ones that have been announced by the AEK Athens' press release. No edits should be made unless a player arrival or exit is announced. Updated 2 July 1965, 23:59 UTC+2.

Transfers

In

 a.  plus Aris Tsachouridis.

Out

Loan out

Overall transfer activity

Expenditure:  ₯450,000

Income:  ₯0

Net Total:  ₯450,000

Pre-season and friendlies

Alpha Ethniki

League table

Results summary

Results by Matchday

Fixtures

Greek Cup

Matches

European Cup Winners' Cup

First round

Statistics

Squad statistics

! colspan="11" style="background:#FFDE00; text-align:center" | Goalkeepers
|-

! colspan="11" style="background:#FFDE00; color:black; text-align:center;"| Defenders
|-

! colspan="11" style="background:#FFDE00; color:black; text-align:center;"| Midfielders
|-

! colspan="11" style="background:#FFDE00; color:black; text-align:center;"| Forwards
|-

|}

Disciplinary record

|-
! colspan="17" style="background:#FFDE00; text-align:center" | Goalkeepers

|-
! colspan="17" style="background:#FFDE00; color:black; text-align:center;"| Defenders

|-
! colspan="17" style="background:#FFDE00; color:black; text-align:center;"| Midfielders

|-
! colspan="17" style="background:#FFDE00; color:black; text-align:center;"| Forwards

|-
|}

References

External links
AEK Athens F.C. Official Website

AEK Athens F.C. seasons
AEK Athens